Pääsküla River is river in Estonia in Harju County. The river is 11.6 km long and basin size is 41.2 km2. It runs into Vääna River.

Over the river is built Pääsküla stone bridge (:et). The bridge is built in 1860s. The bridge is considered as cultural heritage object of Estonia.

References

Rivers of Estonia
Harju County